Noemon is the third solo album by the Greek keyboardist and guitarist Bob Katsionis. It was released on October 14, 2008 under the label Lion Music. Katsionis is currently in the band Firewind.

Track listing 
 "Noemon"  – 4:03
 "Birth of the Sun" – 3:57
 "Tears of Alice" – 3:31
 "Soukse!" – 3:52
 "Delirium In Santiago" – 3:34
 "A Melody Like You" – 3:38
 "The Nightrager" – 3:34
 "Athenian Light" – 4:32
 "Milestone" – 3:30
 "The Wounded Chords" – 4:07
 "Apocalypse" – 3:05
 "Spongeibob Vs Ibob the Builder" – 5:02

Personnel

Band members
Bob Katsionis - Keyboards and guitar

Stelios Pavlou - drums 

George Xyndas - bass guitar

Guest musicians 
Jeff Waters – Guitar solo on "Tears of Alice"
Marcel Coenen – Guitar solos on "Soukse!" and "Athenian Light"
Theodore Ziras – Guitar solo on "Apocalypse"
Lars Eric Mattsson – Guitar solo on "Delirium In Santiago"

References 

2008 albums